is a Japanese former backstroke swimmer. She competed in two events at the 1972 Summer Olympics.

References

External links
 

1954 births
Living people
Japanese female backstroke swimmers
Olympic swimmers of Japan
Swimmers at the 1972 Summer Olympics
Place of birth missing (living people)
Asian Games medalists in swimming
Asian Games silver medalists for Japan
Swimmers at the 1970 Asian Games
Medalists at the 1970 Asian Games
20th-century Japanese women
21st-century Japanese women